Moving Targets is a 1976 album by Flo & Eddie (Mark Volman and Howard Kaylan). Illegal, Immoral and Fattening and Moving Targets were reissued on a single compact disc in 2007 by Acadia Records.

The album features a guest appearance from Skyhooks lead singer Graeme "Shirley" Strachan on "Guns", singing background vocals during the chorus.

The song "Keep It Warm" is interpolated and sampled on rapper Gucci Mane's 2009 single "Lemonade".

Track listing 
All tracks composed by Mark Volman and Howard Kaylan; except where noted.

Side one 
 "Mama, Open Up" – 4:10 
 "The Love You Gave Away" – 3:31 
 "Hot" – 3:25 
 "Best Friends (Theme from the Unsold T.V. Pilot)" – 2:02 
 "Best Possible Me" – 4:03

Side two 
 "Keep It Warm" – 4:16 
 "Guns" – 3:57 (Jim Pons, Volman, Kaylan)
 "Elenore" – 2:10 (Kaylan, The Turtles)
 "Sway When You Walk" – 2:02 
 "Moving Targets" – 4:40

Personnel 
Flo & Eddie Band
Howard Kaylan – vocals
Mark Volman – vocals, guitars
Phil Reed – lead guitar
Andy Cahan – keyboards
Erik Scott – bass
Craig Krampf – drums

Additional personnel
Donnie Dacus – slide guitar on "Hot"
Jeff Baxter – slide guitar on "Hot"
Graeme "Shirley" Strachan – chorus vocals on "Guns"
Ian Underwood – saxophone on "Moving Targets"
Allan MacMillan – strings and horns arranged/conducted

References 

1976 albums
Flo & Eddie albums
Albums produced by Ron Nevison
Columbia Records albums
1970s comedy albums